Merrill Field  is a public-use general aviation airport located one mile (1.6 km) east of downtown Anchorage in the U.S. state of Alaska. The airport is owned by Municipality of Anchorage. It opened in 1930 as Anchorage Aviation Field and was renamed in honor of Alaska aviation pioneer Russel Merrill.

History

Merrill Field, located on the east end of 5th Avenue in Anchorage, was the first official airport in the city when it opened in 1930. It was Anchorage's only airport until 1951, when the introduction of ever larger and faster commercial aircraft required that an airfield with longer and heavier runways be built.

Construction of the original 35-acre site one mile east of the city was completed on 22 Aug. 1929. Originally named Anchorage Aviation Field, it was later renamed Anchorage Municipal Airport. The airport is now named for Russel Merrill, an Alaskan aviation pioneer. An aerodrome beacon was located at Merrill Field and dedicated on 25 September 1932 in Merrill's honor.

The airfield remains in use today as the primary field for private wheel-equipped aircraft in the warmer months, and for ski-equipped aircraft in the winter. A section of the property used to be a municipal landfill.

Facilities and aircraft
Merrill Field covers 436 acres (176 ha, 1.76 km2) and has three runways:
 Runway 5/23: 2,000 x 60 ft (610 x 18 m), surface: gravel/dirt
 Runway 7/25: 4,000 x 100 ft (1,219 x 30 m), surface: asphalt
 Runway 16/34: 2,640 x 75 ft (805 x 23 m), surface: asphalt

For the 12-month period ending September 30, 2013, the airport had 126,234 aircraft operations, all of which were general aviation. There are 844 aircraft based at this airport: 786 single engine, 41 multi-engine, 16 helicopters and one glider.

There are no based jets, although one retired Boeing 727 donated by FedEx is used as a training aid by the University of Alaska Anchorage's Aviation Technology Division, which is based at the airfield. It is not airworthy.

When it landed in February 2013, the Boeing 727 was the largest aircraft ever to have landed at Merrill Field. The landing required special permission from the city, and preparatory surveys of the runway and airfield infrastructure to ensure the aircraft could be landed safely; the captain practiced the landing in a flight simulator beforehand.

The airfield hosts two locally owned flight schools, air taxi services, and fixed-base operators. An extension of the Q Taxiway connects the airport to Alaska Regional Hospital for MEDEVAC operations.

A section of the airport is built over the closed Merrill Field Land Fill. This section requires slightly more maintenance due to settling and emissions.

Airline and destinations

Passenger

Statistics

References

External links

 Municipality of Anchorage: Merrill Field (official website)
 
 

1930 establishments in Alaska
Airports established in 1930
Airports in Anchorage, Alaska
Alaska Dispatch
History of Anchorage, Alaska
University of Alaska Anchorage